Karuz may refer to:
 Karuz, Kurdistan
 Karuz, Sistan and Baluchestan